Lacy Park is a public park located in the city of San Marino, California. It is located in the San Rafael Hills, at 1485 Virginia Road. The park features lush vegetation, open grass space, a rose garden, walking loops, tennis courts, and many other amenities and areas. The main entrance is on Virginia Road, but access is available on St Albans Road ( weekdays only). It is required for non-residents (of San Marino) to pay a $5 fee on weekends.

The park is named after San Marino's mayor, Richard H. Lacy.

Description
Consisting of over thirty acres of open space in the center San Marino, Lacy Park was opened in 1925. It was formerly part of the 19th century Rancho Huerta de Cuati Mexican land grant. Originally Wilson Lake in 1875, the land was purchased by the city in 1925 and dedicated as a park.

The park is known for its extensive arboretum of trees, its immaculate rose garden, and its monument to General George Patton, who once resided in San Marino.

Leashed dogs are allowed in the park. In 2008, the San Marino City Council briefly considered building a dog park within Lacy Park to help fulfill a local resident's Eagle Scout project, but rejected the proposal due to vehement opposition from other residents.

Geologic features
In the center of the park is a depression that was once a sag pond which developed at a left stepover of the Raymond Fault.  The lake (known as Wilson Lake or Kewen Lake ) was drained in the mid-1920s.  Scarp of the fault can be seen in the north part of the park near Virginia Road.

Access
Admission to the park is free during the week, but non-residents of San Marino are charged $5 for admittance on Saturday and Sunday. Although the city claims this fee exists to cover park maintenance and upgrades, Los Angeles Times reporter Steve Lopez reported in 2007 that the city had received hundreds of thousands of dollars from the state and Federal block grants which most cities receive for those purposes. The Los Angeles Times article however states, that according to state law, these fees are legal as long as they are non unreasonable.

See also
El Molino Viejo
Huntington Library, Art Collections and Botanical Gardens

References

San-marino.ca.us/lacy

San Marino, California
Parks in Los Angeles County, California
Municipal parks in California